The Hampshire College Summer Studies in Mathematics (HCSSiM) is an American residential program for mathematically talented high school students.  The program has been conducted each summer since 1971, with the exceptions of 1981, 1996, and has more than 1500 alumni. Due to the Coronavirus pandemic, the 2020 Summer Studies ran online for a shortened program of four weeks.

The program was created by and is still headed by Professor David C. Kelly.

Background
The program is housed at Hampshire College in Amherst, Massachusetts, and generally runs for six weeks from early July until mid-August.  The program itself consists of lectures, study sessions, math workshops (general-knowledge classes), maxi-courses (three-week classes run by the senior staff members), and mini-courses (specialized shorter classes).

On a typical day, students spend four hours in the morning in class, have lunch together with the faculty, and then have several hours to use at their leisure. During this "down time" students and faculty members often host quasis, where they participate in an activity as a small group, such as juggling or making sushi. They return for the "Prime Time Theorem" (an hour-long talk on an interesting piece of mathematics given by a faculty member or a visitor), have dinner, and then spend three hours in a problem solving session. One of the instructors blogged the content of her class.

Many students go on to professional careers in mathematics.  An occasional publication has resulted from work done at the program.  Well-known alumni of the program include two MacArthur Fellows, Eric Lander and Erik Winfree, as well as Lisa Randall, Dana Randall, and Eugene Volokh.  Many alumni return to the campus for a few days around Yellow Pig's Day (July 17) of each year.  This observance was formalized for 2006 in "Yellow Pig Math Days," which was conducted in observance of 2006 being the 34th offering of the HCSSiM Program (34 being a multiple of 17).

The Summer Studies has been funded in the past by the American Mathematical Society and the U.S. National Science Foundation.

Notable alumni
 Bram Cohen, developer of BitTorrent, co-founder of CodeCon
 Matthew Cook, group leader at the Institute for Neuroinformatics at ETH Zurich and computer scientist who proved the Turing universality of Wolfram's Rule 110 cellular automaton
 Lenore Cowen, computer scientist and mathematician at Tufts University
 Alan Edelman, professor of mathematics at the Massachusetts Institute of Technology, Sloan Fellow
 Alan Grayson, former member of the U.S House of Representatives for Florida's 8th and 9th Congressional Districts
 Neil Immerman, professor of computer science at the University of Massachusetts Amherst, Guggenheim Fellow
 Susan Landau, professor of social science and policy studies at Worcester Polytechnic Institute, Guggenheim Fellow
 Eric Lander, professor of biology at MIT and science advisor to Presidents Barack Obama and Joe Biden, MacArthur Fellow and Rhodes Scholar
 Adam Marcus, professor of mathematics at Princeton University
 Cathy O'Neil, data scientist, author, and blogger at Mathbabe
 Jim Propp, professor of mathematics at the University of Massachusetts Lowell
 Lisa Randall, professor of theoretical physics at Harvard University
 Seth Schoen, technologist at the Electronic Frontier Foundation, author of the DeCSS haiku
 Steven Strogatz, Professor of applied mathematics at Cornell University
 Eugene Volokh, Gary T. Schwartz Professor of Law at UCLA School of Law, 
 Erik Winfree, professor of computer science and bioengineering at the California Institute of Technology

See also
 Michael Spivak

References

External links
 HCSSiM Homepage

Hampshire College
Mathematics summer camps